CYRCLE is a collective made up of American artists David Leavitt (Davey Detail) and David Torres (RABI (artist)), born in Los Angeles, California in 2010. Their artwork focuses on life, duality and the human condition combined with the aesthetic consideration of form, typeface, color and balance which creates their signature style.

History
Originally made up of three artists, David Leavitt, David "Rabi" Torres, and Devin Liston,  CYRCLE came together on October 8, 2010. In 2011 the collective first gained public recognition from the street art community after they installed an April Fools joke on a fence at the LA Contemporary Museum of Art. From there, CYRCLE’s artwork started appearing in group shows at local Los Angeles galleries. Their first solo exhibition, WE NEVER DIE (WND), opened in August 2011. The CYRCLE Manifesto, which was developed for the show and has become an important  part of their identity, has traveled around the world with the collective and can be found in Europe, Asia, and many cities across the USA.

After WND, CYRCLE continued to do public works around Los Angeles, as well as commissioned installations. In the Spring of 2012 CYRCLE was asked to travel to Europe for various projects. They were sent to London and Paris to do custom installations and collaborate with artist, and TED Prize winner, JR (artist). While in London Black Dog Productions, whom they worked with in Los Angeles, made an introduction to London-based DJ and Producer, James Lavelle. Lavelle invited them to participate in his “Daydreaming With” show a month later in Hong Kong. Upon returning to the states in the Summer of 2012 Liston decided to leave the collective to embark on a solo art career as well as form a duo with artist Gosha Levochkin called devNgosha.

Now a duo, CYRCLE continued on. In September 2012, as a precursor to their second solo exhibition, they painted what is said to be one of the largest murals on record, standing in Los Angeles. The piece titled, MAGIC IS REAL!  was 11,000 square feet and sits on the walls of Bedrock Studios, located in Echo Park.

Their second solo exhibition, ORGANIZED CHAOS! was held in Los Angeles two months later  and used the bee and the flower as a metaphor for the relationship between art and society as a whole. Inviting the viewer to interact with the artwork itself, various pieces were made up of cubes which could be arranged in different positions. The exhibition ran from November 2012 - December 2012.

In June 2013, CYRCLE returned to Hong Kong for a group exhibition titled, Work In Progress. The exhibition was held in a large vacant office space in Tai Koo Place and saw seven international groups and seven local artists create works using the walls and empty office as a blank canvas. CYRCLE contributed large painted murals, which explored stereotypes in the form of Cowboys and Indians.

One month later they traveled to Lisbon, Portugal for their show titled, CAPTURE THE FLAG! CONQUER THE DIVIDE!, at Underdogs Gallery. This exhibition studied the struggle of nations told through an American perspective. Each piece aimed to force the viewer to identify with the artwork, as seen in some pieces which featured reflective surfaces. The exhibition also featured a large scale sculptural piece that flipped the meaning of the American flag and one that helps re-examine the meaning of American history and its "origin mythology". This showing was part of the Underdogs platform which ran till August 2013.

Following Portugal, CYRCLE completed their three-part series, CAPTURE THE FLAG!, with their exhibition, CAPTURE THE FLAG! HOME IS WHERE YOUR HEART IS!. The solo show comprised mixed-media works referencing Cowboys and Indians, and threaded together narratives of creative expression and liberation.  Beginning at, Work In Progress, and coming back full circle to Hong Kong, the exhibition ran from October 2013 - November 2013 at Above Second Gallery.

Returning from Hong Kong in October, CYRCLE collaborated with musician Woodkid on a large scale mural located in the Hollywood intersection of Santa Monica Boulevard and Highland Avenue.  The work explored the aesthetic and concept of Woodkid's music. It rewarded followers and fans of Woodkid (with his signature keys and lyrics) while still being a CYRCLE piece.

After creating a presence in London in their early years, CYRCLE returned in March 2014, to do their first UK solo exhibition, OVERTHRONE: POORING REIGN!, at StolenSpace Gallery. The aim of the work, according to CYRCLE, was “to overthrow the powers of doubt and oppression in the mind so we, the individual, can let go of fear and take power back!” 

In May 2014, CYRCLE headed to Malmö, Sweden to present their mural “Collapse Part 1″ as part of Artscape Festival 2014. Continuing their, OVERTHRONE! campaign, the mural was painted on the side of the Modern Art Museum, “Moderna Museet Malmo.” This work is the first in a series that will continue to expand as the collective continues to travel across Western Europe.

CYRCLE has collaborated with artists, brands and non-profits including, Google, HBO, Uber, Pharrell, professional skateboarder and artist Chad Muska, David Flores,  Esthero, and the AIDS Healthcare Foundation among others. They have been featured in Pharrell's 24-hour music video for his single, "Happy," in a commercial for Audi, and in publications such as the Los Angeles Times, L.A. Weekly, Huffington Post, HYPEBEAST, and Complex Magazine.

References

External links 
 Official site

American artist groups and collectives
American installation artists
Artists from Los Angeles
Arts organizations established in 2010
2010 establishments in California